Eumetula macquariensis is a species of minute sea snail, a marine gastropod mollusc in the family Newtoniellidae. It occurs in New Zealand.

References

 Powell A. W. B., New Zealand Mollusca, William Collins Publishers Ltd, Auckland, New Zealand 1979 

Newtoniellidae
Gastropods described in 1927